Heart and Soul is the sixteenth studio album by Kenny G. The album was released on June 29, 2010 and produced by Walter Afanasieff. On December 1, 2010, it was nominated for a Grammy Award for Best Pop Instrumental Album.

Track listing

Personnel 
 Kenny G – soprano saxophone (1-10, 12), saxophone arrangements (5), tenor saxophone (11)
 Walter Afanasieff – keyboard and rhythm programming (1-5, 7-12), saxophone arrangements (5), Hammond B3 organ (11)
 Adrian Bradford – keyboards, programming
 Babyface – keyboard and rhythm programming (6), bass (6), backing vocals (6)
 Max G – nylon guitar (4)
 John Raymond – guitar (12)
 Julian Bradford – bass (11)
 Jorge Calandrelli – orchestra arrangements and conductor (1, 4, 5, 7, 10)
 Gina Zimmitti – orchestra contractor (1, 4, 5, 7, 10)
 Robin Thicke – lead and backing vocals (3)

Production 
 Producers – Kenny G and Walter Afanasieff (tracks 1-5, 7-11); Kenneth "Babyface" Edmunds (track 6).
 Additional Production and Engineer – Adrian Bradford
 Production Coordinator – Rich Davis
 Engineers – Steve Churchyard (tracks 1, 4, 5, 7 & 10); Tyler Gordon (tracks 2, 3, 8, 9 & 12); Paul Boutin (track 6); David Channing (track 11).
 Mixed by Mick Guzauski at The G House Studio.
 Mix Consultant – Steve Shepherd
 ProTools Engineer on tracks 1, 4, 5, 7 & 10 – Joe Wohlmuth
 Mastered by Stephen Marcussen at Marcussen Mastering (Hollywood, CA).
 Art Direction – Larissa Collins
 Design – Tommy Steele
 Photography – Dominick Guillemot
 Management – Mark Adelman

Chart performance
The album was also commercially successful, which debuted and peaked at number one in the Billboard Jazz Albums chart on July 17, 2010. It debuted and peaked at number thirty-three in the Billboard 200 on July 17, 2010.

The singles released from this album were quite successful in the Billboard Jazz Songs chart in 2010. "Fall Again" peaked at number six, while "Heart and Soul" debuted at number twenty-three, and peaked at number one.

Charts

References

2010 albums
Kenny G albums
Albums produced by Walter Afanasieff
Concord Records albums